Elginshire and Nairnshire by-election may refer to:

 1879 Elginshire and Nairnshire by-election
 1889 Elginshire and Nairnshire by-election